Peter Elliot Rosenberg (born July 23, 1979) is an American radio disc jockey, television show host, and professional wrestling personality, who is signed to WWE where he is a one-time WWE 24/7 Champion. He is a co-host of two New York City radio programs: Ebro in the Morning, the weekday morning show at hip hop radio station WQHT ("Hot 97"); and The Michael Kay Show on ESPN Radio affiliate WEPN-FM, which is also simulcast on the YES Network.

Early life
Rosenberg was born and raised in Chevy Chase, Maryland, to M.J. Rosenberg, a Capitol Hill staffer father and public school teacher mother, and he attended Bethesda-Chevy Chase High School. He describes his upbringing as "a very Jewish, upper middle class, regular suburban life."  He was introduced to hip hop by his older brother, and has also cited popular songs such as "Parents Just Don't Understand" by DJ Jazzy Jeff & the Fresh Prince as early influences. Visiting his grandparents in Rockaway Beach in Queens, New York, US, he was influenced by radio shows hosted by DJ Red Alert and Marley Marl. He obtained his first set of turntables at the age of 14 years.

Career

Radio
In the summer before his freshman year at the University of Maryland, Rosenberg started hosting a late-night underground hip hop show, From Dusk 'Til Dawn, on campus radio station WMUC-FM. His initial DJ name was "PMD," an acronym for "Peter From Maryland" (a name given to him by Marley Marl while winning a contest on Marl's radio show). After graduating from college, Rosenberg performed as a DJ at a variety of radio stations in the DC area, including WPGC, WHFS and on talk radio at WJFK-FM. He began making online parody videos, which were seen by the soon-to-be program manager of New York's Hot 97 Ebro Darden, and these led to his 2007 hiring at the radio station.

Rosenberg co-hosts the weekday morning show, The Hot 97 Morning Show, on Hot 97 from 6 to 10 a.m. with Ebro and Laura Stylez. They play contemporary hip hop and R&B tracks, interview musicians, and discuss music, relationships, sex and race in a straightforward style. He also hosts Real Late With Rosenberg on Sunday nights on Hot 97, and he and Cipha Sounds co-host the podcast Juan Epstein, which has featured guests such as Jay-Z, Eminem, Rick Ross and Pusha T. Hot 97 is the most listened-to hip hop station in New York City and Rosenberg has said that he dreamed of being on the station as a child.

Rosenberg is also known for supporting and introducing the public to up-and-coming New York rap artists. He was the first media personality to interview rapper Earl Sweatshirt after he returned in 2012 from a nearly two-year hiatus in Samoa. In an April 2014 New Yorker piece on Rosenberg, he explained: "Since I have a foot in both worlds, an artist can play me three tracks, and I can go, ‘This one only hip-hop heads like me will appreciate. This one could be big, but it’s corny. But this one could reach a lot of people, without you sacrificing who you are’".

After becoming mayor of New York City in 2014, Bill de Blasio's debut traditional Friday morning mayoral radio interview was by phone with Rosenberg and Ebro on The Hot 97 Morning Show.

He also hosts a number of podcasts including Bite the Mic with Mike Tyson.

On March 6, 2020, it was announced Rosenberg had signed a deal with WWE to host their monthly pay per view panel shows, as well as other related projects.

Professional wrestling

Since 2009, Rosenberg has hosted a YouTube series called Wrestling with Rosenberg where he has interviewed professional wrestlers including WWE Hall of Famers Hulk Hogan, Shawn Michaels, Mick Foley and Jesse Ventura.

On December 19, 2009, Rosenberg served as a guest commentator for Ring of Honor's (ROH) Final Battle 2009 pay-per-view. He has also appeared for Total Nonstop Action Wrestling (TNA).

In late 2013, he began co-hosting a podcast called Cheap Heat with Grantland wrestling journalist David Shoemaker.

In February 2015, he appeared on WWE Hall of Famer Stone Cold Steve Austin's podcast.

On December 4, 2016, Rosenberg made his first appearance as a panelist on the TLC: Tables, Ladders & Chairs pre-show. In January 2017, Rosenberg became the host of the WWE Network show, Bring it to the Table, alongside Paul Heyman and John "Bradshaw" Layfield, with Corey Graves replacing Heyman in later episodes.

Since 2017, Rosenberg has also served as a panelist on numerous pay-per-view pre-shows as well as several Talking Smack and Raw Talk post-shows.

On January 31, 2021, at the Royal Rumble, Rosenberg, who was serving as a pre-show panelist, pinned R-Truth to win the WWE 24/7 Championship. The following day, however, R-Truth snuck up on him live on The Michael Kay Show and pinned him to win back his title.

TV/video
Rosenberg hosted Hip Hop Squares on MTV2 for both of its two seasons. The show, which aired from May 22, 2012, to December 18, 2012, was based on the tic-tac-toe game show Hollywood Squares. It featured a rotating cast of rappers, DJ's, comedians, and sports and TV personalities as the nine squares on the board.

Rosenberg is the host of Noisemakers, a hip hop interview series that began in 2008. Past guests include Nas, DJ Premier and Diddy. Interviews take place primarily at the 92nd Street Y in Manhattan. The series has been described as a hip hop version of Inside the Actors Studio.

In June 2013, he began hosting a new original video series on Complex TV. On The Process, he interviews new and established hip hop artists about their songwriting approach. The first episode's guest was Raekwon. Other subjects include Prodigy, Schoolboy Q, Azealia Banks, Future and Goodie Mob.

Concerts
Rosenberg throws an annual summer concert, Peterpalooza, in celebration of his birthday. The first took place at the Best Buy Theater in Manhattan in 2012, and featured performances from Odd Future, Raekwon, Asher Roth, Nitty Scott and Smoke DZA. The second, at Williamsburg Park in Brooklyn in 2013, featured performances from Schoolboy Q, Meek Mill, Odd Future, Fabolous and World's Fair.

Nicki Minaj controversy
After Rosenberg implied on the small stage at Hot 97's Summer Jam 2012 concert that Nicki Minaj's pop single "Starships" was not "real hip-hop", Minaj, the concert's scheduled headliner, withdrew from the concert. Rosenberg declined to apologize, clarifying that his comments were not meant as an attack on Minaj, and that she is "inherently hip hop… it’s just that 'Starships' is definitely not." Minaj was replaced on the bill by Nas and Lauryn Hill.

On May 28, 2013, nearly a year after the dispute began, Minaj appeared as a guest on Rosenberg's Hot 97 morning show. The two made up, with Rosenberg apologizing and noting that he doesn't have anything against Minaj personally. Minaj said that she should not have canceled her performance, but was annoyed at the time due to her lack of familiarity with Rosenberg. A week after appearing on Hot 97, Minaj joined 2 Chainz at Summer Jam 2013, performing two songs with the rapper.

Discography
Rosenberg has released two official mixtapes. The first was What's Poppin' Vol. 1 in 2011, more than half of the rappers on the tape were from New York. Artists include Action Bronson, The Kid Daytona, Skyzoo, Raekwon, Kendrick Lamar, Danny Brown, J. Cole, Odd Future and Sugar Tongue Slim. In April 2013, he released his second official mixtape, The New York Renaissance, with new music from A$AP Rocky, A$AP Ferg, Joey Bada$$, Action Bronson, Flatbush Zombies, Troy Ave, Smoke DZA and others. He voiced the intro for Rick Ross's 2012 mixtape The Black Bar Mitzvah. He also made an appearance on the track "Sincerely Yours" from Little Brother's sophomore album The Minstrel Show.

Compilation albums
 Real Late (2021)

Mixtapes
 What's Poppin' Vol. 1 (2011)
 The New York Renaissance (2013)

Personal life
Rosenberg is Jewish and was married to sportscaster Alexa Datt until 2018. They lived on the Upper West Side in Manhattan, where he currently resides. In regard to his affection for hip hop music, Rosenberg stated in an April 2014 interview: "I will go toe to toe with almost anyone in terms of knowledge, trivia, and love of this music."
Since 2020, he has been in a relationship with New York photographer, Natalie Amrossi. Rosenberg announced his engagement to Amrossi on the June 22nd, 2022 edition of the Michael Kay Show.

Filmography

Championships and accomplishments 
WWE
 WWE 24/7 Championship (1 time)

References

External links
 RosenbergRadio.com
 Peter Rosenberg at Hot 97

Living people
1979 births
American podcasters
University of Maryland, College Park alumni
Bethesda-Chevy Chase High School alumni
People from Chevy Chase, Maryland
Professional wrestling journalists and columnists
Professional wrestling podcasters
Radio personalities from New York City
American television talk show hosts
20th-century American Jews
Jews and Judaism in New York City
American sports radio personalities
American people of Arab descent
Celebrities who have won professional wrestling championships
WWE 24/7 Champions
21st-century American Jews